Troparyovo-Nikulino District   is an administrative district (raion) at the southern edge of Western Administrative Okrug, and one of the 125 raions of Moscow, Russia. The western border is the Moscow Ring Road, and the southern border is Leninsky Prospekt. Population: 119,000 (2016 est.)

Education
The German School Moscow is located in Troparyovo-Nikulino District.

Other education organizations:
 Moscow State University of Fine Chemical Technologies
 Moscow State Institute of Radio Engineering, Electronics and Automation
 Russian Presidential Academy of National Economy and Public Administration

Famous buildings

See also

Administrative divisions of Moscow

References

Notes

Sources

Districts of Moscow